Buhana is a tehsil (sub-district) and a municipality in the Jhunjhunu district of the Indian state of Rajasthan.

History
The village was founded in 1234 by Bhawani Singh.

Main sights
Religious buildings
Buhana is an ancient devotional land. There are two holy hermitage (Ashrams): Dhoona Dhaloda and Lihlay. There are also many temples: Ram Janki Mandir, Radhakrishna Mandir, Khemka kuldevi Mandir, Shikharband Mandir, 24 ka Mandir, Dakshinmukhi Balaji Mandir and Maharana wali Devi Mandir. The pabuji ka Devara, built by Raika community of Buhana about 200 years ago, is a live example of secularism where all the gods and goddesses of Hinduism, Peer baba Mazar (Muslims) and Crist Chabutra (Christians) are still lying existed. Both worship places i.e. Baba Umed Singh ki Medi and Pabuji ka Devara are still a devoted place of worship by Hindus and Muslims. A peace of Gauchar bhoomi called bani measuring about 18000 bighas under gram panchayat buhana is a place of wildlife preservation which provides a livelihoods to all communities of cattle breeders and pollution free environment to its surroundings. It is also available in Indian history that this bani was a part of Chiman Rishi Ashram which was located on Doshi mountain Haryana hardly 20 km away and the famous brand of medicines still in existence i.e. Chimanprass was invented out of herbal plants of this bani which was a part of that Ashram and the Pandavas of Mahabharat have spent few days in this Bani. It has a huge possibilities to develop a tourist place specially for wild life lovers and herbals medicinal practitioners. The another secular place is Gogaji ki medi which is well known as god of snakes. Indeed, the Bani, Devra and both Medi are pride of Bihana. Recently, a Khadesari Baba has also made his presence in the bani for providing a supper Gaushala and a decent Asharam for the followers.

Personalities
Baba Umad Singh (19th century), Hindu spiritual leader

References

External links
Government site of Jhunjhunu District
Government of Rajasthan website

Cities and towns in Jhunjhunu district